In psychology research literature, the term child prodigy is defined as a person under the age of ten who produces meaningful output in some domain to the level of an adult expert professional.

Mathematics and science

Mathematics
 Blaise Pascal (1623–1662) was a French mathematician, physicist, and religious philosopher who wrote a treatise on vibrating bodies at the age of nine; he wrote his first proof, on a wall with a piece of coal, at the age of 11 years, and a theorem by the age of 16 years. He is famous for Pascal's theorem and many other contributions in mathematics, philosophy, and physics.

 Lev Landau (1908–1968) was a Soviet physicist who mastered calculus by age 13. He graduated from the Baku Gymnasium aged only 13 as well. Landau is today best known for his work in superconductivity and a series of textbooks he co-authored with Evgeny Lifshitz.

 John von Neumann (1903–1957) was a "mental calculator" by the age of six years, who could tell jokes in classical Greek. Von Neumann went on to make numerous contributions to mathematics, economics, physics, and computer science. (Note: Several mathematicians were mental calculators when they were still children. Mental calculation is not to be confused with mathematics. This section is for child prodigies largely or primarily known for calculating skills.)

The arts

Music

Literature
 William Cullen Bryant published his first poem at the age of 10; at the age of 13 years, he published a book of political satire poems.
 Minou Drouet caught the notice of French critics at the age of eight, leading to speculation that her mother was the true author of her poetry. She later proved herself to be the author.

Visual arts
 Edmund Thomas Clint (1976–1983) was an Indian child prodigy. He is known for having drawn over 25,000 paintings, though he lived to be just six years and 11 months old.

Games

Chess
See Chess prodigy for details of child prodigies at chess.

Go 

 Sumire Nakamura was competing in national Go tournaments in Japan by the time she was seven, and became the youngest professional go player at age 10.

See also
 List of child prodigies in fiction
Lists of child actors
List of child sportspeople

References

Lists of children